A dirndl is a feminine dress which originated in German-speaking areas of the Alps. It is traditionally worn by women and girls in Bavaria (south-eastern Germany), Austria, Liechtenstein, Switzerland and Alpine regions of Italy. A dirndl consists of a close-fitting bodice featuring a low neckline, a blouse worn under the bodice, a wide high-waisted skirt and an apron.

The dirndl is regarded as a folk costume. It developed as the clothing of Alpine peasants between the 16th and 18th centuries. Today it is generally considered the traditional dress for women and girls in German-speaking parts of the Alps, with particular designs associated with different regions. The usual masculine tracht counterpart of the dirndl is lederhosen.

In the late 19th century the dirndl was adapted by the upper and middle classes as a fashion mode, and subsequently spread as a mode outside its area of origin. There are many varieties of adaptations from the original folk designs. The dirndl is also worn as an ethnic costume by German diaspora populations in other countries.

Name 
Although in current German usage,  now generally signifies 'prostitute', the word originally meant only 'young woman'. In Bavaria and Austria,  can mean a young woman, a girlfriend or the dress.

 is the form of the word in Standard German.

 Speakers of German have conflicting opinions as to whether the name "dirndl" can be used for traditional as well as modern designs. Some speakers make a sharp break between traditional folk costume and the "dirndl", a word which they use only for modern designs. She says: "In this category the designs in general keep to patterns which go back to the historical costume models; only the materials, skirt lengths and colour compositions change from season to season and correspond to the trends coming from centres of fashion." This distinction assumes that the term "dirndl" describes only clothing of more modern design. 

However, many other German-speakers use the terms "dirndl" and "tracht" interchangeably for a woman´s dress of the general dirndl style, regardless of whether the design is traditional or modern. For instance, tracht scholar Gexi Tostmann, who sees the modern dirndl as having evolved from traditional tracht designs, also uses the term "dirndl" for historical designs. A developing consensus is that a dirndl can be described as "tracht" when it has been traditionally worn by a distinct people group over a long period. This implies that a dress based on the design principles of Alpine tracht can also be called a "dirndl", even if it has a documented history of centuries as a folk costume. For example, the traditional blue polka-dotted dress of the Wachau region of Austria can be referred to either as "Wachauer Tracht" or as the "Wachauer (everyday) dirndl" In English, the name "dirndl" is used interchangeably for traditional and modern designs.

Description

Basic design 
The dirndl consists of a bodice, skirt, blouse, and apron.

The bodice ( or ) is tight to the body, with a deep neckline (décolletage). It is typically made in a single piece, with the join in the front centre, secured by lacing, buttons, a hook-and-eye closure or a zip. A zip can also be on the back or the side. Traditionally, the bodice was made from dark heavy cotton, so that it would be hard-wearing. In more modern designs, it may be made from cotton, linen, velvet or silk. The material is coloured or printed. The neckline of the bodice is traditionally round or rectangular (called "balconette"). In more modern designs, it may alternatively be high, V-shaped, heart-shaped or extra deep. The bodice often has embroidered decoration, especially when worn for public events.

The skirt is full, with folds gathered in at the waist. Before the 1930s, it was separate from the bodice, but since then the two have been sewn to one another. Originally the skirt was long, but in more modern designs it is typically mid-length. Miniskirt versions also exist. Traditionally, the skirt has a pocket on the side or in front, which is hidden under the apron.

The blouse is worn under the bodice, and is cropped above the midriff. The blouse changes the overall effect of the dirndl particularly through the cut of its neckline. A deeply cut blouse combines with a deeply cut bodice to accentuate décolletage, whereas a blouse with a high neckline gives a more modest effect. In traditional designs, the blouse neckline is at the base of the throat. Other popular necklines are V-shaped, balconette or heart-shaped. Materials most often used are cambric, linen or lace. The colour is usually white. Short puff sleeves are typical, although narrow sleeves (short or long) are also common.

The apron is attached to the skirt and is narrow, covering only the front of the skirt. Traditional apron designs vary according to local tradition and are typically only a single colour. In modern designs, the designs are more elaborate.

The winter style dirndl has heavy, warm skirts, long sleeves and aprons made of thick cotton, linen, velvet or wool. The colours are usually brown, deep green or dark blue.

Traditional dirndls 

Traditional dirndls vary in design between regions and even villages. The different details may indicate the place of origin and social status of the wearer. As with other folk costumes, traditional dirndls often come in two forms: one for everyday occasions, the other for traditional festivals and formal wear. Dirndls worn in everyday use are rural domestic clothing, made from grey or coloured linen, sometimes with leather bodice and trim. Dirndls used on formal occasions are usually made with materials, designs, colours and embroidery specific to the region.

Some traditional designs feature pieces which drape over the breast, often combined with an elaborate collar. This has the function of concealing décolletage, in line with traditional Catholic ideas of modesty.

Accessories 
Jewellery worn with the dirndl includes necklaces, earrings, chokers and chains. Also popular are brooches made of silver, the antlers of deer or even animals' teeth. Décolletage is often enhanced with a balconette bra, especially for large public events.

 In spring, the front of the bodice is sometimes decorated with a corsage of fresh flowers. Other popular accessories include waistcoats, silk aprons and vibrantly coloured, hand-printed silk scarves (the latter especially in the Austrian Ausseerland). In colder weather, long-sleeved woolen jackets are worn, as are knitted woolen shawls. 

The dirndl is often worn with a hair ornament called the : a small floral wreath traditionally worn by unmarried women. In Hinterskirchen in Bavaria, unmarried women wear a small crown. In more formal settings (such as church festivals), a hat or bonnet is traditionally worn. This headgear developed in the 17th century from a veil or headscarf and was worn by middle class urban women; later the custom spread to the countryside. The goldhaube is characterized by interwoven silk and golden threads, embroidered with lamé, gold and sequins.

Shoes worn with the dirndl are typically court shoes (pumps) or flat, ballerina-type shoes. Knee-length socks or tights are commonly worn on the legs.

Dress etiquette 
Because the appeal of the dirndl is its rustic look, plastic dirndls with flashy ornaments are looked down upon. Style experts recommend staying away from cheap outfits that one can buy on the street corner; it is better to spend a little more to get an outfit. The dirndl should be tightly fitted to look right. It is an absolute faux-pas to wear a dirndl without a blouse.

There is an urban legend that claims the placement of the knot on the apron is an indicator of the woman's marital status. In this story, which is not based in tradition, tying the sash on the woman's left side indicates that she is single, and a knot tied on the right means that she is married, engaged or otherwise not interested in dating.

Adaptations 
A dirndl skirt is a full, wide skirt, gathered into folds at the waist.

Examples would be single-piece dresses featuring a dirndl skirt.

In recent decades, fashion designers have been creating their own interpretations of the dirndl. While appearing to be simple and plain, a properly made modern dirndl may be quite expensive as it is tailored, and sometimes cut from costly hand-printed or silk fabrics.

A recent adaptation is the African dirndl, which is a fusion fashion: the bodice and skirt are made from African printed material. The idea was innovated by two Cameroonian sisters and Chief executive officers of the Noh Nee label in Munich, Marie Darouiche and her sister Rahmée Wetterich. The African dirndl was premiered at Oktoberfest in 2019.

Similar designs 
Since similar design elements occur in other European folk costumes, these designs are sometimes mistaken for dirndls. Similar designs occur in other tracht traditions in German-speaking countries (e.g. the Gutach valley tracht from the Black Forest), as well as traditional folk costume in Norway (Bunad) and Denmark.

History 
The dirndl has passed through different periods in its history. These include (1) its origins as rural clothing, (2) development as a recognized folk costume, (3) evolution as a fashion style, (4) appropriation by the Nazis, (5) decline in popularity after the Second World War, followed by a resurgence from the 1990s. Each of these periods has left an impression on the design and perception of the dirndl.

Origins 

The dirndl originated as a dress worn in rural areas, a more hardy form of the costume worn today. Rural costumes originated in the countryside; they showed that the wearer belonged to a particular social class, occupation, religious persuasion or ethnic group. Differing designs developed in the different regions. They were influenced by urban fashions, costumes in neighbouring regions, available materials, as well as fashions in the royal courts and in the military.

Dresses similar to the dirndl, featuring skirts with bodices, aprons and blouses were commonplace in Europe from the 16th to the 18th centuries. Similar elements are present in other German folk costumes, for instance the tracht designs found in the Black Forest; they also occur in folk costumes in other parts of Europe, such as the Norwegian women's Bunad and the Upper Carniola costume of Slovenia. Distinctive features of the dirndl (including the tight bodice, lower neckline and wide skirt), developed from the women´s fashions of the royal court in the 17th century; over time, the court fashions made their way into urban and rural clothing. Alpine traditional costume spread to regions in Bavaria and Austria outside the mountains through migration in search of work. As a result, the dirndl developed over time into female Austrian servants' work clothes.

 Distinctions developed between the everyday version of rural costumes and the version used for festive occasions; the festive version of each costume tradition was considered the ideal form. Festive dirndls were especially worn at events associated with the Catholic church, such as Sunday church services and public pilgrim processions. Other popular occasions included markets and Volksfeste. Over time, festive versions of the dirndl developed elaborate decoration around the collar and breast, including embroidery, floral decorations, tassels and lace collars draped over the shoulders and breast. Elaborate headwear (such as the Goldhaube) developed to indicate distinctions in social status.

Nevertheless, folk costume was increasingly perceived as a marker of rural and working classes. The background to this development was the French government policy from the mid-17th century onwards of promoting and exporting luxury fashion, using expensive materials such as silk, lace, and gold and silver thread. Attempts by other European governments to fight French economic dominance of the fashion industry had the effect of spreading fashion in the French style. For instance, the Austrian empress Maria Theresa considered imposing a sumptuary tax to prevent expenditure on French luxury fashions, but was persuaded to establish a home-grown fashion industry on the French model. Although the rich usually led fashion, the middle classes and even peasants copied the trends among the wealthier classes. By 1800, dress styles were similar among many Western Europeans; local variation became first a sign of provincial culture and later a mark of the conservative peasant.

Thus the spread of French fashions increased the contrast between the fashionable clothes of the wealthier classes and folk costumes, which were increasingly perceived as rustic, not fit for polite society. This point is illustrated by the first Oktoberfest, held in 1810 to celebrate the wedding of Crown Prince Ludwig of Bavaria (later King Ludwig I) to Therese of Saxe-Hildburghausen; the citizens of Munich were invited to the festivities but were supplied with French clothes, since their folk costumes were not considered suitable for public occasions.

Development of the dirndl as folk costume (19th century) 

 
As antithesis to the dominance of French fashion, in the early 19th century a movement to study and preserve the traditional costumes of the rural populations developed in many European countries. Examples of this movement outside the German-language sphere include the Highland romantic revival in Scotland, the Danish folklore movement and the Bunad movement in Norway. The folk costume movement is one aspect of national romanticism, and part of the more widespread Romantic movement of the early 19th century.

Art historian Gabriele Crepaldi points out the links between the ideological and political dimensions of the Romantic movement:

As Crepaldi observes, the Romantics promoted emotion against the rationalism of the Enlightenment, individual freedom against academic dictates and national against global culture. In Germany, Austria and Switzerland, the Enlightenment was especially associated with France, which had sent its armies across Europe in the Revolutionary and Napoleonic Wars (1792–1815). In response to the humiliations of the repeated French invasions, the protagonists of German romanticism sought to strengthen their cultural heritage. The result was a flowering of research and artistic work centred around Germanic cultural traditions, expressed in painting, literature, architecture, music and promotion of German language and folklore. The promotion of folk costumes similarly strengthened national identity in a visible way, especially against French-inspired fashions.

 The earliest public promotion of tracht in the German-speaking world occurred in Switzerland, at the Unspunnen festivals of 1805 and 1808. At both events, a parade of traditional costumes was held; the 1808 festival resulted in the formation of the Swiss National Costume Association.
 
In Bavaria and Austria, the royal courts developed enthusiasm for the different costumes of the rural population, which they saw as a means of strengthening national unity; this was consistent with the philosophy of national romanticism, which considers the state to derive its political legitimacy from the unity of those it governs. The first extensive description of traditional tracht in the different regions was given by the Bavarian official Joseph von Hazzi (1768–1845). A comprehensive description of Bavarian national costumes was published in 1830 by the archivist Felix Joseph von Lipowsky. A parade of traditional costumes took place in 1835 at Oktoberfest, to celebrate the silver wedding anniversary of King Ludwig I of Bavaria (reigned 1825–1848) and Queen Therese. Under his successor Maximilian II (reigned 1848-1864), traditional costumes were officially recognised as clothing suitable for wearing at the royal court. The king himself included officials wearing tracht in his court ceremonies and wrote in 1849 that he considered the wearing of folk costume of "great importance" for national sentiment.

In 1859, the first association to promote folk costume was founded in Miesbach in Bavaria. In the following years, similar tracht associations were founded throughout Germany and Austria.  The tracht associations promoted research and wearing of the traditional clothing in each region. This helped preserve the traditions against modern fashions; in contrast, the wearing of the traditional tracht declined in regions where the tracht associations were not active. The first umbrella organisation for the tracht associations was founded in 1890.

By the later 19th century, it had become popular for members of the royal courts in Austria and Bavaria to wear folk costume, in order to promote identification between the population and the court. Among the most prominent royal patrons of folk costume were the Austrian Emperor Franz Joseph and Luitpold, Prince Regent of Bavaria, the successor of Ludwig II; both often hunted wearing lederhosen. Around 1875, Elisabeth of Bavaria, the wife of Austrian Emperor Franz Joseph, promoted wearing a rustic dress called a 'Sisi', based on the peasant dirndl.

Evolution as a fashion style (1870s–1930s) 

The wearing of folk costume by royalty encouraged its adoption by other members of the upper and wealthier middle classes. From the 1870s onwards, the dirndl developed as a typical "country" dress amongst the wealthy patrons of the summer resort towns in Austria and Bavaria. An important influence was German Romantic literature, which contrasted the allegedly natural, unspoilt and unpolluted people of the countryside with the artificiality and depravity of urban society. The adoption of the dirndl as a fashion resulted in a synthesis of tradition and high fashion: the dirndls worn by upper class women took the basic design of the traditional dirndl but also used more fashionable materials such as silk, lace and expensive thread. The garment was made more closely fitted to emphasize the female body shape. The adoption of the dirndl by upper and middle classes raised the status of the traditional clothing; this in turn encouraged country people to value and continue wearing the traditional folk costumes.

Key in the evolution of the dirndl to a commercial fashion were the Jewish brothers Julius (1874–1965)  and Moritz Wallach (1879–1963),, originally from Bielefeld in north-western Germany. After they moved to Munich with their family in 1890, they became interested in and began promoting Alpine tracht. They employed seamstresses, who industriously produced the first elegant dirndls from colourful printed fabrics, predominantly silk. The dresses were exhibited by models from the firm in the Alpine resorts. A major breakthrough for the Wallach brothers came in 1910, when they organized and paid for the traditional costume parade for the 100th anniversary celebrations of the Oktoberfest. The Wallach brothers also became suppliers to the European aristocracy with their unique hand-sewn creations; they designed a dirndl for Princess Marie-Auguste of Anhalt, which created a sensation at a ball in Paris.

In the hard economic times following the First World War, the dirndl became a big-seller; as a simple summer dress, it was an affordable alternative to the often expensive and elaborately worked historic women's costumes.

 In Austria, the wearing of folk costume was promoted by Viktor von Geramb (1884–1958), professor of folk culture at the universities of Graz and Vienna. He saw folk costume as a means of rejuvenating Austrian identity after the collapse of the Austro-Hungarian monarchy during the First World War. Von Geramb was critical of the tracht associations for insisting rigidly on the historic designs, which were treated as a uniform of the association. He argued that, for folk costume to be a living tradition, it needed to express the individuality of the wearer; thus designs and materials needed to be adapted to contemporary culture and technology. Accordingly, he worked with commercial firms on finding material and designs that would allow the production of folk costume in large quantities. Consequently, Alpine tracht gained in general popularity and even spread to eastern Austria, where it had not been part of the traditional clothing culture. The dirndl was increasingly perceived as the Austrian national dress.

In 1930, the Wallach brothers supplied the stage costumes for the operetta The White Horse Inn. The romantic comedy presented an idyllic picture of the Austrian Alps and had long runs in cities like Berlin, Vienna, Munich, London, Paris and New York. Inspired by the lively innkeeper heroine, the dirndl became an international fashion phenomenon, always with an apron and usually with deep décolletage. This widespread adoption was helped along by a general 1930s trend to a silhouette which matched the folk costume: full skirts, higher hemlines, broader shoulders and tailored waists.

The dirndl was also promoted through the Trapp Family Singers, who wore dirndls during their performance at the Salzburg Festival (1936), and later on their worldwide tours. In addition, the film Heidi, with Shirley Temple in the lead role, became a hit in 1937. By that year, the dirndl was considered a 'must' in the wardrobe of every fashionable American woman.

Appropriation by the Nazis (1930s–1945) 

German traditional costume, including the dirndl, was instrumentalized by the Nazis as a symbol of pan-German identity in the countries under Nazi rule (Germany from 1933, Austria from 1938). The dirndl was used to promote the Nazi ideal of the German woman as hard-working and fertile. An example is a propaganda photo released by the (Nazi Party) Office of Racial Politics (right), showing a young blonde girl wearing a dirndl, watching over small boys playing.

Jews were forbidden to use "folk culture", even though they had played such a prominent role in documenting and promoting it. In 1938, the Wallach brothers were forced to sell their business under cost. Moritz Wallach emigrated to the United States, followed shortly after by Julius. Their brother Max, who had also been involved in the business, was interned in Dachau concentration camp and was murdered at Auschwitz in 1944.

Viktor von Geramb, who had promoted the dirndl in Austria, lost his position at the University of Vienna in 1938 because of his public opposition to Nazi racial theory. He was especially criticized for his strong attachment to Christian ideas of human worth. He was restored to his position at the university only after the defeat of the Nazi régime in 1945.

The National Socialist Women's League established the office of the "Reich Commissioner for German costume" under the leadership of Gertrud Pesendorfer (1895–1982). In 1938, she published dirndl designs by Gretel Karasek (1910–1992), which Pesendorfer described as "renewed costume". Pesendorfer claimed that Karasek made the following innovations from traditional designs: (1) the collar was removed, allowing display of décolletage; (2) long sleeves were replaced by puff sleeves; (3) the waist was emphasised with tighter lacing and buttons; and (4) the skirt was reduced to mid length. The overall effect accentuated the female form and especially the breasts. Pesendorfer described the new style as "de-catholicised"; she said her goal was to free the costume of "overburdening by church, industrialization and fashionable cries" and "foreign influences" and to let the "rogue sub-culture" back again. However, Pesendorfer´s claims should be critically evaluated, since all the innovations allegedly made by Karasek were already present in the previous decades during which the dirndl evolved as a fashion. For instance, the painting "" painted by Emil Rau (see above) clearly shows puff sleeves, although Rau died in 1937, before Karasek´s designs were published.

Decline and resurgence (1945–present) 

The Second World War (1939–1945) began a downturn in the popularity of the dirndl. After Hitler’s invasion of Poland in 1939, American and British consumers began rejecting all things German. In turn, new fashion influences appeared in popular culture, such as the film Gone With the Wind, which premiered less than three months after the fall of Warsaw. By 1941, the dirndl had been replaced as an American fashion craze by the wasp waist.

 In Germany and Austria, the dirndl declined in popularity, especially in the cities. Its image had been tarred by association with the Nazis, like other Germanic traditions, such as beer-drinking and sausages. Traditional clothing was often associated with conservative political views. As a consequence, the dress was regarded as old-fashioned or rustic by many, especially those connected with the fashion industry.

Nevertheless, many others continued to wear the dirndl as a dress for festive occasions, both in the countryside and in cities such as Munich. Dirndls were regarded as suitable clothing for attending church, public holidays, Oktoberfest and other festive occasions. The dirndl was especially popular in Bavaria as a bridal dress.

A wider revival of interest came with the 1972 Summer Olympics in Munich. Led by Silvia Sommerlath (now Queen Silvia of Sweden), the hostesses wore sky-blue dirndls as a promotion of Bavarian identity. Culture historian Simone Egger comments, "As (Sommerlath) in 1972 made headlines as an Olympia hostess in a dirndl, then every woman wanted to have a dirndl."

In the 1980s, there was a further revival of interest in the dirndl, as traditional clothing was adopted by the environmental and anti-nuclear movements. The rural connotations of the clothing and the fact that it is produced from natural, rather than synthetic materials, go well with a desire to return to a "world that is intact".

Beginning in the late 1990s, dirndls and lederhosen experienced a boom in Austria and Bavaria, with some commentators speaking of a "dirndl Renaissance". By 2013, it had become standard for every young Bavarian to have traditional clothing in their wardrobe. This increased interest in traditional clothing was noticed by fashion houses. Since the 2000s, increasing numbers of fashion houses have become involved in designing and selling high-end versions. The garment was praised in 2001 by designer Vivienne Westwood during a visit to a fashion event in Austria. When some of the attendees criticised the garment as old-fashioned, she responded, "I do not understand you Austrians. If every woman wore a dirndl, there would not be any more ugliness". Subsequently, Westwood and her husband were honoured with the tile "Ambassador for Tracht" in 2010.

 Dirndls and lederhosen have long been standard attire for staff at Volksfeste, but in the 1970s visitors at the festivals did not normally wear folk costume, even at Oktoberfest. Simone Egger comments that the idea of wearing folk costume to Oktoberfest would previously have been considered "completely absurd, even embarrassing." Now the idea of wearing jeans to a Volksfest is unthinkable: folk costume is considered obligatory. In a study in 2004, Egger found that, from a sample group of those attending Oktoberfest, 50% were wearing tracht for the first time. She found that the enthusiasm for tracht clothing was increasing every year.

One reason given for the increasing popularity of the dirndl and lederhosen is an increased confidence in German self-identity. In the years following the Second World War, there was often a shame in German identity because of the crimes of the Nazi régime. In recent decades, there has been a celebration of being German. This "new patriotism" was evident in the support for the German football team at the 2006 FIFA World Cup. According to journalist Michaela Strassmair, "As the international media arrived in Munich for the World Cup, they all wanted to see the same picture and share it with the world: pretty girls in Munich wearing dirndls."

 The culture historian Peter Peter comments on this increased pride in German identity and traditions:

Other commentators link the upsurge in folk costume to economic insecurity caused by globalization, prompting a return to traditional cultural symbols. Simone Egger concludes that the renewed popularity of traditional clothing is driven by desires for community and belonging, symbolized by folk costume. These desires stand in tension with the desire for individuality, expressed in alterations and decoration. Culture journalist Alfons Kaiser makes similar observations:

The dirndl is increasingly attracting attention apart from its area of origin. In 2019, The Times of India ran an article featuring Bollywood actress Celina Jaitley wearing a dirndl; she urged other Indian women to add the dress to their wardrobe.

Recent customs by country

Austria 
In Austria, dirndls continue to be worn on public occasions, even by younger women. The dirndl is considered an important part of Alpine folk culture. Other aspects of folk culture are Lederhosen for men, traditional sports (e.g. shooting, music, crossbow), skills (e.g. embroidery) and musical traditions (e.g. singing Christmas carols and Schuhplattler dance groups).

The Catholic church has played an important role in promoting the dirndl in Austria; traditional dress is worn for worship services, especially the major church holidays (e.g. Easter, Pentecost, Corpus Christi) and saints´ feast days.

Folk costume also continues to be worn for most weddings and festivals. Old traditions are carefully maintained among inhabitants of Alpine areas, even though this is seldom obvious to the visitor: many people are members of cultural associations where the Alpine folk culture is cultivated. At cultural events, the traditional dirndl is the expected dress for women. Visitors can get a glimpse of the rich customs of the Alps at public Volksfeste. Even when large events feature only a little folk culture, all participants take part with gusto. Good opportunities to see local people celebrating the traditional culture occur at the many fairs, wine festivals and firefighting festivals which fill weekends in the Austrian countryside from spring to autumn. Only in the region surrounding Vienna is the traditional folk culture not a regular part of daily life.

Some regions are particularly known for their strong dirndl traditions, such as the Tyrol, the Salzkammergut and the Wachau region of Lower Austria.

In Austria, the dirndl is a symbol of national identity, seen in Austria as a national symbol. In tourist settings, staff in offices, restaurants, wineries and shops often wear dirndls as a work uniform; this is also the case in the non-Alpine regions in the east of Austria. Even in everyday life, many Austrian women wear dirndls as an alternative to other fashions.

Styles are both less extravagant and show less décolletage than at Oktoberfest.

In Austria, and other parts of south central Europe, there are literally splashy events known as Dirndlspringen, in which attractive young women, are judged by how well they jump, or even just step, from a diving board into a lake or a swimming pool while wearing the dirndl, using it as a swimdress.

Germany 

In Germany, the dirndl is traditionally worn only in Bavaria, where it is deeply integrated in the traditional culture. For instance, dirndls are traditionally worn by women attending formal ceremonies of the Catholic church. In many Bavarian villages, processions to honour St George and St Leonard are special occasions for wearing Alpine tracht. The traditional dirndl is also the normal attire of women attending events associated with Alpine folk culture. Volksfeste often feature events at which traditional dirndls from regions are worn, as illustrated in the photo on the right. In all of these activities, the dirndls normally worn are the traditional local designs, considered most suitable for formal occasions. Modern commercially designed dirndls are worn on less formal occasions.

The traditional designs are promoted by and protected by local folk culture associations affiliated with the Bayerische Trachtenverband (Bavarian folk costume association). The designs specify the traditional materials, patterns and colours of clothing, together with jewellery, hats, etc. Currently, six official types of Alpine tracht are recognized in Bavaria, each with designs for men (lederhosen) and women (dirndl): Miesbacher Tracht, Werdenfelser Tracht, Inntaler Tracht, Chiemgauer Tracht, Berchtesgadener Tracht and Isarwinkler Tracht.

The dirndl is regarded as a symbol of Bavaria. It is often worn by women working in businesses related to tourism or traditional culture, including Volksmusik, restaurants and beer gardens.

In recent decades, women from other parts of Germany have shown increasing interest in the dirndl as a festival dress. This is especially evident in changing fashions at Oktoberfest, the world´s largest Volksfest. Until the 1970s, most visitors to Oktoberfest did not wear traditional tracht; it was common to wear jeans. Since the late 1990s dirndls and Lederhosen have come to be regarded as obligatory wear at the festival. The name Wiesntracht is given to dirndls and other tracht clothing worn for Oktoberfest (Wiesn refers to the Theresienwiese, where the Oktoberfest events occur). Oktoberfest dirndls tend to be more colourful and revealing. Skirts are often above the knee, and deep décolletage is very frequent. In 2005, gossip magazine Bunte reported that at Munich Airport there was a place which was always important for fashion observers at Oktoberfest time: the women´s toilets in Domestic Arrivals. "There the ladies who have flown in wearing street clothes with shouldered clothes-bags vanish - and appear from Baggage Collection in full dirndl bloom. Because they don´t trust themselves to board the aircraft as Bavarians, but arriving in Munich not dressed for the Wiesn would be unseemly."

There is increasing evidence that Germans are coming to view the dirndl as a German, rather than an exclusively Bavarian symbol. In the past few years, "Oktoberfest" celebrations have developed in parts of Germany remote from Bavaria, such as Münster in Westphalia. Dirndls and lederhosen are now considered an intrinsic part of such events. Other evidence is the successful marketing of dirndls in the German national colours for wearing at football matches, noticeable at the 2006 FIFA World Cup. Meanwhile, high-end German fashion houses are designing and selling their own designs.

Italy

In Italy the dirndl is part of the traditional clothing culture in the Alpine province of South Tyrol. The region was part of the Austrian county of Tyrol before the First World War, but was ceded to Italy in 1919 in the Treaty of St-Germain at the end of the war. In South Tyrol, both German and Italian are official languages, and Tyrolean traditions including the dirndl remain deeply integrated in the culture. The dress is worn on festive occasions, such as processions of the Catholic church. Traditional designs vary between regions, valleys and sometimes villages.

The local dirndls and lederhosen are displayed in several local museums. There are permanent exhibitions at the South Tyrolean Folklore Museum in Dietenheim, the Steinegg Local Museum and the Bolzano Municipal Museum. Public events featuring folk costume include the Val Gardena folklore festival ("") and the Country Wedding in Kastelruth.

Liechtenstein 
Folk costumes for women in Liechtenstein correspond to the definition of a "dirndl" in English, although the local tracht association discourages the name "dirndl". The official national dress of Liechtenstein features a black skirt and a white blouse with crocheted and bobbin laced necklines and sleeves. Bodices and aprons are made of silk; their traditional colour was red, but modern designs often substitute blue or green. As worn for national dress, the bodice is decorated with silver embroidery featuring a princely crown in the middle of the bodice. Accessories include a black wheel-shaped bonnet featuring silver embroidery, white lace gloves, white stockings and black shoes with a silver buckle. Other variations include floral headbands or crown-shaped headpieces.

The current designs have been in use since at least the 1930s, but their origins can be traced much earlier. Similar designs have been found in archaeological remains from Vaduz, Gamprin and Eschen. Especially notable is an excavated church graveyard in Mauren from around 1700, which included well-preserved garments and a bonnet.

Switzerland 
The Swiss refer to an Austrian or German traditional dress as a dirndl, but refer to their own traditional dress as a tracht. As is the case in the neighboring country of Liechtenstein, the use of the term dirndl for a Swiss dress is discouraged. The style varies by region, for example a Bernese Tracht. These are worn during festivities on Swiss National Day (August 1st) or during seasonal celebrations which vary by canton, such as at harvest time or the end of winter. 

In the canton of Zürich, the imminent end of winter is celebrated by the Sechseläuten festival. The name comes from Swiss dialect referring to the town crier ringing six o'clock. Organizations descended from medieval guilds show their colors. Parades feature members wearing traditional costumes. The festivities culminate with the burning of a large snowman made of straw. How long it takes his head to explode indicates whether the coming summer will be cool or hot.

In the German diaspora 
Outside its countries of origin, the dirndl has become an ethnic costume, worn as an identity marker by members of the German diaspora. This term refers to German-speakers and their descendants who live in countries where German is a minority language.

Germans, Austrian, Swiss and Scandinavian people migrated to North America in the 19th century. Germans made a strong contribution to the gene pool of Montana, Minnesota, the Dakotas, Missouri, Wisconsin, New York City and Chicago. The German American ethnic group are their descendants in North America, and form part of the worldwide German diaspora.

Beginning in 1920 and especially after World War II, many Danube Swabians migrated to the United States, Brazil, Canada, Mexico, Austria, Australia, and Argentina. Across the United States there are dozens of German-American cultural or heritage clubs, such as the Donauschwaben heritage clubs. The clubs host events and festivals (such as Von Steuben Day parades) to preserve and celebrate their heritage with the surrounding communities. During these festivals, participants often dress in traditional outfits such as dirndls and lederhosen. 

Dirndls and lederhosen are also worn as party clothing at Oktoberfest celebrations around the world. This is especially the case when the celebration takes place in a German diaspora community, such as the Oktoberfest celebrations at Colonia Tovar in Venezuela or the Fiesta Nacional de la Cerveza in Villa General Belgrano, Argentina.

Dirndls in popular culture

Films featuring women in dirndl costumes 

 Above Suspicion (1943)
 Almost Angels
 Charlie's Angels
 Chitty Chitty Bang Bang
 Ferris Bueller's Day Off
 Heidi (1937) and (1968)
 Heidi's Song
 The Legend of Silent Night
 
 The Merry Wives of Tyrol
 Miss Congeniality
 The Monastery's Hunter (1935)
 National Lampoon's European Vacation
 The Pink Panther (1963)
 The Pink Panther Strikes Again
 The Producers
 Salzburg Stories (1957)
 Sissi
 Snow White and the Seven Dwarfs
 The Sound of Music
 Summer in Tyrol
 The Trapp Family
 The Trapp Family in America
 The Violin Maker of Mittenwald
 Where Eagles Dare
 The White Horse Inn (1926), (1948), (1952) and (1960)

The dirndl in philately 
The Austrian postal service regularly issues postage stamps featuring dirndls and other Austrian folk costumes. The stamp series is released under the title  (classic folk costumes). In April 2020, the 85 cent stamp featured the blue printed dirndl worn as everyday workwear in the Wachauer Tracht tradition. In 2016, the postal office issued a novelty stamp featuring an embroidered dirndl; only 140,000 specimens were issued.

See also 

 Austrian folk dancing
 Lederhosen
 Schuhplattler
 Tracht
 Folk costume
 Volksfest
 Oktoberfest

References

Bibliography
 
 Greger, Michael J. and Johann Verhovsek: Viktor Geramb 1884–1958. Leben und Werk. Verlag des Vereins für Volkskunde, Vienna 2007, . (in German)
 Guenther, Irene: Nazi chic?: Fashioning women in the Third Reich. Berg, Oxford 2010.  (in English)
 Hollmer, Heide and Kathrin Hollmer: Dirndl. Trends, Traditionen, Philosophie, Pop, Stil, Styling. Edition Ebersbach, Berlin 2011.  (in German)
 Lipp, Franz C., Elisabeth Längle, Gexi Tostmann, Franz Hubmann (eds.): Tracht in Österreich. Geschichte und Gegenwart. Brandstätter, Vienna, 1984, . (in German)
 Müller, Daniela and Susanne Trettenbrein: Alles Dirndl. Anton Pustet Verlag, Salzburg 2013. . (in German)
 Pesendorfer, Gertrud: Neue deutsche Bauerntrachten. Tirol. Callwey, Munich, 1938. (in German)
 Radakovich, Uta: Trachten in Südtirol, Reverdito, 2009, . (in German)
 Reuter, Ulrich: Kleidung zwischen Tracht + Mode. Aus der Geschichte des Museums 1889–1989. Museum für Volkskunde, Berlin, 1989. (in German)
 Ständecke, Monika: Dirndl, Truhen, Edelweiss: die Volkskunst der Brüder Wallach / Dirndls, Trunks, and Edelweiss. The Folk Art of the Wallach Brothers. Jüdisches Museum, Munich 2007.  (in German, with English translation)
 Ständecke, Monika: "Das Volkskunsthaus Wallach in München: Ein Beitrag über die 'Wiederbelebung’ der 'Volkskunst’ zur Zeit der Weimarer Republik." In: Jahrbuch für Europäische Ethnologie – Neue Folge, ed. Ferdinand Schöningh. Brill, Leiden, 2008. Pp. 65–90.
 Tostmann, Gexi: The dirndl: With instructions. Panorama, Vienna 1990.  (in English)
 Tostmann, Gexi: Das Dirndl: Alpenländische Tradition und Mode. Christian Brandstätter, Vienna, 1998.  (in German)
 Wallnöfer, Elsbeth: Geraubte Tradition. Wie die Nazis unsere Kultur verfälschten. Sankt Ulrich-Verlag, Augsburg 2011, . (in German)
 Weber, Christianne and Renate Moller. Mode und Modeschmuck 1920–1970 / Fashion and Jewelry 1920–1970. Arnoldsche Verlagsanstalt, 1999. . (in German, with English translation)

External links

The essential Dirndl (and Lederhosen) guide – Austrian Tourist Office website
German dirndl – Destination Munich
The long history of a very special traditional costume – Oktoberfest website
Traditional Costumes in South Tyrol – suedtirolerland.it

Links to online suppliers:
 Daller Tracht (Germany)
Dirndl.com (Germany)
 Dirndl Karin Kolb (Germany)
 Finest Trachten (Germany)
 Kerstins Landhausmode (Germany)
 Official Oktoberfest shop (Germany)
 Ernst Licht (USA)
 Mydirndl.com (USA)

1890s fashion
1930s fashion
19th-century fashion
German clothing
Austrian clothing
Swiss clothing
Skirts
Dresses
German culture
Austrian culture
Women's clothing
Culture of Altbayern

bar:Diandl